The Netherlands competed at the 1992 Summer Olympics in Barcelona, Spain. 201 competitors, 117 men and 84 women, took part in 105 events in 20 sports.

Medalists

Competitors
The following is the list of number of competitors in the Games.

Archery

The only elimination victory for the Dutch archers came from Erwin Verstegen, who won in the round of 32 before being defeated in the second round. Three archers did not make it to the elimination rounds.

Athletics

 Men
 Track & road events

 Combined events – Decathlon

 Women
 Track & road events

Boxing

 Men

Cycling

Seventeen cyclists, thirteen men and four women, represented the Netherlands in 1992.

Road
 Men

 Women

Track
 Sprint

 Pursuit

 Time trial

 Points race

Diving

Hockey

Men's tournament

Head coach: Hans Jorritsma

 Frank Leistra (GK)
 Harrie Kwinten
 Cees Jan Diepeveen
 Pieter van Ede
 Bastiaan Poortenaar
 Wouter van Pelt
 Marc Delissen (C)
 Jacques Brinkman
 Gijs Weterings
 Stephan Veen
 Floris Jan Bovelander
 Hendrik Jan Kooijman
 Bart Looije (GK)
 Maarten van Grimbergen
 Leo Klein Gebbink
 Taco van den Honert

Group play

Semi final

Bronze medal match

Women's tournament

Head Coach: Roelant Oltmans

 Jacqueline Toxopeus (GK)
 Carina Bleeker (GK)
 Caroline van Nieuwenhuyze
 Annemieke Fokke
 Cécile Vinke
 Jeannette Lewin
 Carina Benninga (C)
 Daniëlle Koenen
 Ingrid Wolff
 Mieketine Wouters
 Martine Ohr
 Florentine Steenberghe
 Noor Holsboer
 Helen van der Ben
 Wietske de Ruiter
 Carole Thate

Group play

Fifth to eighth place classification

Fifth and sixth place

Rowing

Rowing events, finishes, and competitors:

Men

Women

Qualification Legend: FA=Final A (medal); FB=Final B (non-medal); FC=Final C (non-medal); FD=Final D (non-medal);  SA/B=Semifinals A/B; SC/D=Semifinals C/D; SE/F=Semifinals E/F; QF=Quarterfinals; R=Repechage

Sailing

 Men

 Women

Swimming

 Men

 Women

Synchronized swimming

Three synchronized swimmers represented the Netherlands in 1992.

Tennis

Men

Women

Volleyball

Summary

Men's team competition

 Team roster
Edwin Benne
Peter Blangé
Ron Boudrie
Henk-Jan Held
Martin van der Horst
Marko Klok
Olof van der Meulen
Jan Posthuma
Avital Selinger
Martin Teffer
Ronald Zoodsma
Ron Zwerver
 Head coach: Arie Selinger

Women's team competition
 Team roster
Cintha Boersma
Erna Brinkman
Heleen Crielaard
Kirsten Gleis
Aafke Hament
Marjolein de Jong
Vera Koenen
Irena Machovcak
Linda Moons
Henriëtte Weersing
Sandra Wiegers
 Head coach: Peter Murphy

Water polo

 Men's team competition

 Preliminary round (group B)
 Lost to Spain (6-12)
 Lost to Italy (4-6)
 Drew with Greece (4-4)
 Lost to Cuba (9-11)
 Drew with Hungary (13-13)
 Classification Round (Group E)
 Defeated Czechoslovakia (9-8)
 Defeated France (15-8) → 9th place
 Team roster
 ( 1.) Arie van de Bunt
 ( 2.) Marc van Belkum
 ( 3.) Gijs van der Leden
 ( 4.) Harry van der Meer
 ( 5.) John Scherrenburg
 ( 6.) Hans Nieuwenburg
 ( 7.) Koos Issard
 ( 8.) Jalo de Vries
 ( 9.) John Jansen
 (10.) Robert Havekotte
 (11.) Jan Wagenaar
 (12.) Remco Pielstroom
 (13.) Bert Brinkman

References 

Nations at the 1992 Summer Olympics
1992
S